The Bonifraterska Street in Warsaw, Poland, is one of the main streets of Warsaw's New Town, stretching from Długa Street and the Krasiński Palace to Słomiński street.

It is one of the most historical of Warsaw's streets.

Streets in Warsaw